De Mars may refer to:

 De Mars (surname)
 De Mars, Gelderland, Dutch hamlet
 De Mars, De Blesse, Dutch smock mill

See also
 DeMar
 Champ de Mars (disambiguation)